Yannick Salmon (born April 7, 1990) is an American-born Jamaican footballer who plays as a defender.

Career

College & Amateur
Salmon played one year of college soccer at the University of Maryland in 2007 before transferring to Rutgers University where he played from 2008 to 2010.

Professional career
Salmon was drafted 27th overall by Chicago Fire in the 2011 MLS Supplemental Draft. However, he wasn't signed by the team.

Salmon signed his first professional contract in February 2013, when he joined Finnish club MYPA.

International career
Salmon featured for the Jamaican U17 national team in 2007.  He also featured for the Jamaica U20 in 2008.

References

1990 births
Living people
American soccer players
Jamaican footballers
Jamaica under-20 international footballers
Jamaica youth international footballers
Jamaican expatriate footballers
Maryland Terrapins men's soccer players
Rutgers Scarlet Knights men's soccer players
Jersey Express S.C. players
Myllykosken Pallo −47 players
Association football defenders
Soccer players from New York (state)
Expatriate footballers in Finland
Chicago Fire FC draft picks
USL League Two players
Veikkausliiga players
People from Westbury, New York